Barbara Hackman Franklin (born March 19, 1940) is an American government official, corporate director, and business executive. She served as the 29th U.S. Secretary of Commerce from 1992–1993 to President George H. W. Bush, during which she led a presidential mission to China.

Prior to her cabinet position, Franklin served in the presidential administrations of Richard Nixon, Gerald Ford, Jimmy Carter, and Ronald Reagan. She was one of the original commissioners and first vice chair of the U.S. Consumer Product Safety Commission. In 2006, she received the Woodrow Wilson Award for Public Service.

Franklin has served on the board of directors of 18 companies, including Dow Chemical, Aetna Inc., Westinghouse, and Nordstrom. Directorship magazine and the American Management Association named her one of the most influential people in corporate governance, and in 2014 she was inducted into the Directorship 100 Hall of Fame. She is currently the president and CEO of Barbara Franklin Enterprises, a private international consulting firm.

Franklin was one of the first women graduates of the Harvard Business School. She was married to Wallace Barnes, retired chairman and CEO of Barnes Group.

Early life, family, and education
Born as Barbara Ann Hackman in Lancaster, Pennsylvania, on March 19, 1940, to Mayme (née Haller) and Arthur A. Hackman. She attended Hempfield High School in Landisville, Pennsylvania.  Prior to her graduation in 1958, she was the class valedictorian, president of the student council, captain of the field hockey and tennis teams, and a cheerleader.

In 1962, Franklin graduated with distinction from Penn State University and received its Distinguished Alumni Award in 1972. She is a sister of Kappa Alpha Theta and was its Beta Phi chapter president. At Penn State, she was the president of Mortar Board, secretary-treasurer of Pi Sigma Alpha, a member on the Liberal Arts Student Council, and a representative to the Student Government Association. Dorothy Lipp, the dean of women at Penn State, nominated Franklin for a full-scholarship to the Harvard Business School, which was, for the first time, opening its doors to women and would accept one nomination from Penn State. With a partial scholarship and loans, Franklin entered the newly co-ed Harvard Business School as one of 14 women in a class of 680 men. In 1964, Franklin received her M.B.A. from Harvard Business School, and was honored with an Alumni Achievement Award in 2004.

For several years after her graduation, she worked in the corporate world. She joined the Singer Company in New York City, first in the consumer products division and then as a member of the corporate planning staff. At Singer, she became manager of environmental analysis, creating a new function that tracked competitive activity globally. After four years there, she became the assistant vice president on the corporate planning staff of the First National City Bank (later Citibank) in New York City from 1969 to 1971. At the time, she was tasked by the CEO, Walter Wriston, to study the bank's relationships with government entities. Her analysis led to the bank's first government relations department, which she created and headed until 1971.

Government service

Nixon administration
In 1971, while at the First National City Bank, Franklin was recruited by President Richard Nixon to bring more qualified women into high-level, policy-making government positions. Her appointment was part of a multi-pronged initiative by the Nixon administration following a press conference on February 6, 1969. During this press conference, Vera Glaser, a reporter for the North American Newspaper Alliance, asked President Nixon,

In February 1971, Nixon gave Fred Malek, head of Presidential Personnel and a former classmate of Franklin's at Harvard Business School, the task of hiring a woman who would spearhead the effort to recruit other women for policy-making government jobs. Malek asked Franklin to be this recruiter, and on April 12, 1971, Franklin began her position for this presidential initiative. An official press release from the White House announced Franklin on April 22, 1971, as a "Staff Assistant to the President for Executive Manpower" – a title that was later changed simply to "Staff Assistant to the President" after her first press conference, wherein the press questioned how she could recruit women with the word manpower in her title.

On April 21, 1971, Nixon issued a directive to the heads of White House departments and independent agencies to create specific action plans to "clearly demonstrate our recognition of the equality of women by making greater use of their skills in high level positions." He required these executive departments to:

 Develop and put into action a plan for attracting more qualified women to top appointive positions by the end of the year; 
 Develop and put into action a plan for significantly increasing the number of women, career and appointive, in mid-level positions; 
 Ensure the substantial numbers of the vacancies on their Advisory Boards and Committees be filled with well-qualified women; and 
 Designate an overall coordinator who will be held responsible for the success of the project. On each of these requirements, Nixon required the heads to submit their plans no later than May 15, 1971.

Following the release of this memorandum, Franklin was charged with monitoring the implementation progress on each departments' action plans.

By April 1972, along with the other presidential initiatives, Franklin's efforts led to the tripling of the number of women placed into policy-making positions, from 36 women to 105 women, in this first year alone.  By May 1973, this number further increased to 130 women, and Franklin had created a talent bank of 1,000 qualified women for future openings. More than half of these policy-making positions to which women were appointed during this time were previously held only by men.  Among them were Cynthia Holcomb Hall, judge on the United States Tax Court; Marina von Neumann Whitman, the first woman on the president's Council of Economic Advisers;  Romana Banuelos, the first Hispanic to be U.S. treasurer; Betty Southard Murphy, general counsel of the National Labor Relations Board; and Dixy Lee Ray, the first and only woman to chair the U.S. Atomic Energy Commission.

At the mid-level, more than 1,000 women were advanced into many positions that women had never held before, such as sky marshals, tug boat captains, FBI agents, and forest rangers. The number of women appointed to boards and commissions increased as well, from over 250 in the first year, to 339 women by the end of May 1973. It was during this time that the first women became generals and admirals in the U.S. Armed Forces.

A Matter of Simple Justice

On March 8, 2012, the book A Matter of Simple Justice: The Untold Story of Barbara Hackman Franklin and A Few Good Women was launched at the National Archives and Records Administration in Washington, D.C., in a program covered by C-SPAN and moderated by Judy Woodruff of PBS NewsHour. The book is written by Lee Stout, Librarian Emeritus and former Head of Public Services and Outreach for Special Collections at the Penn State University Libraries. When he retired in 2007, Stout had served as Penn State's university archivist for 27 years.  In 1994, Franklin donated her governmental papers to the Penn State University Archives.  Stout was cataloging Franklin's papers when he became interested in those which detailed her service to recruit women in the Nixon administration. He called Franklin and suggested an oral history project to preserve the memories of the men and women involved in this presidential initiative.

In 1997, the "A Few Good Women" oral history project was created with an advisory board chaired by Franklin and with a cooperative relationship with the Penn State University Libraries. Initially, the Board had a list of twelve women appointees from the Nixon administration to be interviewed, including Margita White, Constance B. Newman, and Helen Delich Bentley, former Congresswoman and Chair of the Federal Maritime Commission.  The list eventually expanded to include nearly 50 interviews, which are currently housed in the Special Collections Library at Penn State University.

A Matter of Simple Justice: The Untold Story of Barbara Hackman Franklin and A Few Good Women  is based on the "A Few Good Women" oral history project. In a two-part format, the book first focuses primarily on the historical narrative of the Nixon administration's efforts to bring women into high-level government positions, Franklin's specific efforts, and the results of this period. In the second part of the book, Stout highlights the personal stories of many of the other interviewees from this project, such as Ambassador Anne Armstrong, Senator Elizabeth Dole, Judge Cynthia Hall, and Secretary of Housing and Urban Development Carla Hills. Interviewees talk about early influences, breaking down barriers, the impact on family, the role of networking, and the particular challenge of gaining entry to the legal profession.

The "A Few Good Women" project has received major funding from the Aetna Foundation, which has also provided grants for the "A Few Good Women" teaching aids project, designed by Penn State University Libraries staff. The teaching aids are designed to provide the oral histories, biographies, audio segments, images, and digitized historical documents of the "A Few Good Women" collection in the form of a curriculum for students in grades 6–12.

Consumer Product Safety Commission
Franklin's accomplishments as a staff assistant to President Nixon led to her nomination by Nixon as one of the first of five original commissioners of the Consumer Product Safety Commission (CPSC). She was sworn in on May 14, 1973, for a term of seven years. She served under presidents Nixon, Gerald Ford, and Jimmy Carter. On June 13, 1973, she was elected and served as the first Vice Chairman of the CPSC until 1974.  She served again as the Vice Chairman from 1977 to 1978. During these years, Franklin concentrated on improving safety for children and pioneering the use of cost/benefit analysis. Her letters to President Carter and her speeches led to that administration's creation of the United States Regulatory Council to coordinate the numerous agencies engaged in research or regulation of carcinogens, such as the Occupational Safety and Health Administration (OSHA), the Environmental Protection Agency (EPA), and the Food and Drug Administration (FDA).

Part-time presidential appointments
Prior to her appointment as Secretary of Commerce, Franklin held several part-time presidential appointment positions, including her membership of the President's Advisory Committee for Trade Policy and Negotiations (1982–86; 89–91) by appointment of presidents Ronald Reagan and George H.W. Bush. She chaired the Task Force of Tax reform (1985–86) and was a member of the North American Free Trade Agreement (1991). She was appointed by President George H. W. Bush and confirmed by the U.S. Senate to serve as an Alternative Representative & Public Delegate, UN General Assembly, 44th Session (1989–90).

Secretary of Commerce

On December 26, 1991, President George H.W. Bush announced his intention to nominate Franklin as the 29th Secretary of Commerce, replacing Robert Mosbacher.  This nomination was approved by the United States Senate and shortly thereafter she was sworn in on February 27, 1992, which made Franklin the highest-ranking woman in the George H.W. Bush administration and the 13th woman to serve in the US Cabinet.

As Secretary of Commerce, she achieved a major goal: increasing American exports, most notably with China, Russia, Japan, and Mexico. She led a presidential mission to China in December 1992 for the purpose of normalizing commercial relations between the United States and China. In China, she and her counterpart, Minister Li Lanqing, reconvened the Seventh Session of the U.S.-China Joint Commission on Commerce and Trade (JCCT). The JCCT had been moribund since the events at Tiananmen Square in June 1989, when the U.S. placed a sanction on China banning high-level government-to-government contact. Her mission lifted that sanction and brought back $1 billion in new contracts for American companies. This mission gave a "green light" to U.S. companies interested in business opportunities in China, and trade with China grew dramatically in the ensuing years as did U.S. investment in China.

In a letter to the editor of the New York Times published on December 29, 1992, Franklin said:

In January 1993, Franklin's appointment as Commerce Secretary ended with the inauguration of Bill Clinton to the presidency.

Political activity
Franklin has been a participant in every Republican convention from 1972 to 2008 as a delegate, organizer, or speaker, and has been involved in numerous campaigns, both on the national and state levels. Franklin was an early supporter of George H. W. Bush following his bid for the 1988 nomination. She was co-chair of the national finance committee, organized outreach activities, and chaired a fundraising dinner in 1991 for his campaign that raised more than $1 million.

Business and corporate governance
In 1979, Franklin was named a Senior Fellow of the Wharton School of Business at the University of Pennsylvania.  From 1980 to 1988, she worked and lectured at the Wharton School's MBA program and served as the director of the Wharton Government and Business Program.  At Wharton, Franklin recreated a program to bring MBA candidates to Washington, D.C. as part of their course work.

Following her departure from the Consumer Product Safety Commission, Franklin was offered seats on the boards of several large U.S. companies, such as Dow Chemical, Aetna, Inc., and Westinghouse. By the end of the 1980s, Franklin was on the boards of seven large companies and was cited by the American Management Association as one of the 50 most influential corporate directors in America. Franklin has served on the board of directors of 14 public companies and four private companies. She has served on every possible board committee, and has chaired six public company audit committees, two governance committees, and has served as lead director. She was non-executive chairman of Guest Services, Inc.

Currently, she is a member of the International Advisory Board of LafargeHolcim, Zurich, Switzerland. She became Chairman Emerita of the National Association of Corporate Directors (NACD) in May 2013, following the completion of a four-year term during which NACD expanded dramatically. She is Chairman Emerita of the Economic Club of New York, of which she served as the first woman chairman, and is the past president and first woman president of the Management Executives' Society.

She is a board member of the U.S.-China Business Council, a board member of the National Committee on United States – China Relations, the Atlantic Council, the Richard Nixon Foundation and the National Symphony Orchestra. She is a member of the Committee for Economic Development (CED), the Council on Foreign Relations, the Asia Society, the International Women's Forum and member emeritus of the Public Company Accounting Oversight Board (PCAOB) Advisory Council.  She is a former trustee of the Pennsylvania State University and a former member of the Board of Dean's Advisors at Harvard Business School.

Franklin is a founding member of Executive Women in Government and of the Women's Forum of Washington, D.C. Franklin has been a regular commentator on international economic matters and corporate governance on national media sources, most notably PBS's Nightly Business Report.

Prior to her service as Secretary of Commerce, in 1984 she founded Franklin Associates, a management and consulting firm, where she served as the president and CEO until 1992. Currently, she serves as the president and CEO of Barbara Franklin Enterprises, headquartered in Washington, DC.

Awards and honorary degrees

Governance awards

Leadership awards

	
	
		
	
	

		

Franklin is also included in numerous "Who's Who" publications.

Honorary degrees

See also
 List of female United States Cabinet members

References

External links
A Few Good Women... The Honorable Barbara Hackman Franklin
 Barbara Franklin Enterprises

 A Matter of Simple Justice: The Untold Story of Barbara Hackman Franklin and A Few Good Women

1940 births
20th-century American politicians
American women chief executives
Atlantic Council
Connecticut Republicans
Dow Chemical Company
George H. W. Bush administration cabinet members
Harvard Business School alumni
Living people
Pennsylvania Republicans
Pennsylvania State University alumni
Businesspeople from Lancaster, Pennsylvania
Politicians from Lancaster, Pennsylvania
United States Secretaries of Commerce
University of Pennsylvania
Women members of the Cabinet of the United States
20th-century American women politicians